Zinc finger protein 274 is a protein that in humans is encoded by the ZNF274 gene.

This gene encodes a zinc finger protein containing five C2H2-type zinc finger domains, one or two Kruppel-associated box A (KRAB A) domains, and a leucine-rich domain. The encoded protein has been suggested to be a transcriptional repressor. It localizes predominantly to the nucleolus. Alternatively spliced transcript variants encoding different isoforms exist. These variants utilize alternative polyadenylation signals.

References

Further reading

External links 
 
 

Transcription factors